Trite auricoma, commonly known as the golden-brown jumping spider, is a species of jumping spider endemic to New Zealand.


Description 
Adults are 8.4mm to 8.8mm in length. The cephalothorax is coloured dark brown and is shaped rectangular and flattened. The abdomen tends to be patterned with grey-brown and orange colours. When fully mature, males have a yellow clypeal band that resembles a mustache. Females do not have this feature. Males also have a slimmer body and longer frontal legs.

Taxonomy 
Trite auricoma was first described by Arthur T. Urquhart in 1886 as Attus auricomus (Urquhart, 1886). Urquhart proceeded to unknowingly describe T. auricoma synonyms several times as Plexippus capillatus, Attus suffuscus, Attus kirkii and Attus adustus in 1890 and 1893, respectively. Independently, in 1917, Raymond Comte de Dalmas described another synonym, Trite vafra,  from samples he collected with Eugène Simon after visiting New Zealand from 1912 to 1913. In 1935, after examining type specimens from Canterbury Museum, Elizabeth Bangs Bryant placed A. auricomus in the Trite genus and renamed the species as T. auricoma. Bryant also recognized P. capillatus, A. suffuscus, A. kirkii, A. adustus and T. vafra as synonyms of T. auricoma.

Etymology 
In Latin, the species name "auricoma" translates to "gold hair" ("auri" translates to gold, "coma" translates to hair). This is likely a reference to the gold-brown colour of the spider.

Distribution and habitat 
Trite auricoma is widely distributed throughout New Zealand. T. auricoma can often be found in rolled up leaves of flax (Phormium) or underneath dropped cabbage tree (Cordyline) leaves. T. auricoma can also be found underneath stones, in vegetation and also on the ground.

Diet 
Like all spiders, Trite auricoma is an obligate carnivore. In experimental conditions, juvenile T. auricoma has been observed feeding on aphids and small flies such as Drosophila. In experimental conditions, T. auricoma were more selective about prey choice, and fed on small flies and tachnids. T. auricoma also have to learn what is good to eat. It has been reported that juveniles will only eat slaters once, but then never again.

Behaviour

Hunting 
Like most salticidae, Trite auricoma is a visual predator. If there is a fly within 15 cm of the front of the spider, the spider becomes alert. In the first stage, the legs and abdomen are shifted and straightened. The hind legs then become drawn in and the spider begins to slowly move towards the prey. Once the spider is 3–4 cm from its prey, it leaps and pierces the prey with its fangs. If a fly or other prey appears behind the spider, the spider will turn around and begin stalking. If the prey moves during stalking, the spider will turn its cephalothorax so that it is pointed at the prey. The abdomen will then also be moved into line with the cephalothorax and stalking will be resumed. If the prey begins to flee, then the spider will give chase and pounce.

Hunger is thought to initiate hunting behaviour.

Juvenile T. auricoma must learn to perfect the movements required in hunting. Juveniles usually miss their prey the first few times they hunt.

Interactions with conspecifics 
The spiderlings of T. auricoma do not react to each other while they are in the egg sac. However, once they have emerged, confrontations between juveniles result in one or both spiders raising their front legs. At this point, both spiders back away.

Parasites 
Trite auricoma has been observed being parasitized by Priocnemis nitidiventris, which paralyses the spider and feeds it to its young.

References

Salticidae
Spiders of New Zealand
Spiders described in 1886
Endemic fauna of New Zealand
Endemic spiders of New Zealand